Shrawan Mukarung is a Nepalese poet and writer. He was born in Dilpa Village of Bhojpur district on June 8, 1968 (Jestha 26, 2025 BS). He has published two books of poem, one book of songs, one book of drama and one album of songs so far.

Mukarang received a Moti Award from the National Youth Service in 2003.

References

Living people
People from Bhojpur District, Nepal
Nepalese male poets
Nepalese dramatists and playwrights
Nepali-language writers
Nepalese songwriters
Nepali-language poets
Lyric poets
Nepali-language lyricists
Rai people
1968 births